The 2022 Asian Men's Volleyball Cup, so-called 2022 AVC Cup for Men was the seventh edition of the Asian Cup, a biennial international volleyball tournament organised by the Asian Volleyball Confederation (AVC) with Thailand Volleyball Association (TVA). The tournament was held at Nakhon Pathom Gymnasium, Nakhon Pathom, Thailand from 7 to 14 August 2022.

As hosts, Thailand automatically participate for the tournament, while the remaining 10 teams, qualified from the 2021 Asian Men's Volleyball Championship in Chiba, Japan.

Host selection
On 2 December 2021, at the AVC meeting in Bangkok, Thailand, AVC initially announced that the tournament would be held in Taiwan. The tournament was to take place in the city of Taipei. But with Taiwan's strict COVID-19 protocols conflicting with FIVB and AVC's guideline, the tournament relocated to a new host country.

On 23 June 2022, AVC announced that Thailand will host the relocated 2022 Asian Men's Volleyball Cup.

Qualification

The 12 AVC member associations qualified for the 2022 Asian Men's Volleyball Cup. Thailand qualified as hosts and the 11 remaining teams qualified from the 2021 Asian Championship and zonal wildcards. But later Qatar withdrew and China took its place, and Kazakhstan also withdrew. The 11 AVC member associations were from five zonal associations, including, Central Asia (3 teams), East Asia (5 teams), Oceania (1 team), Southeast Asia (1 team) and West Asia (1 team).

Qualified teams
The following teams qualified for the tournament.

Pools composition
The overview of pools was released on 17 March 2022.

* Qatar withdrew and China took its place.
** Kazakhstan also withdrew.

Venues

Pool standing procedure
 Total number of victories (matches won, matches lost)
 In the event of a tie, the following first tiebreaker will apply: The teams will be ranked by the most point gained per match as follows:
 Match won 3–0 or 3–1: 3 points for the winner, 0 points for the loser
 Match won 3–2: 2 points for the winner, 1 point for the loser
 Match forfeited: 3 points for the winner, 0 points (0–25, 0–25, 0–25) for the loser
 If teams are still tied after examining the number of victories and points gained, then the AVC will examine the results in order to break the tie in the following order:
 Set quotient: if two or more teams are tied on the number of points gained, they will be ranked by the quotient resulting from the division of the number of all set won by the number of all sets lost.
 Points quotient: if the tie persists based on the set quotient, the teams will be ranked by the quotient resulting from the division of all points scored by the total of points lost during all sets.
 If the tie persists based on the point quotient, the tie will be broken based on the team that won the match of the Round Robin Phase between the tied teams. When the tie in point quotient is between three or more teams, these teams ranked taking into consideration only the matches involving the teams in question.

Preliminary round
All times are Indochina Time (UTC+7:00).

Pool A

|}

|}

Pool B

|}

|}

Pool C

|}

|}

Pool D

|}

|}

Classification round
All times are Indochina Time (UTC+7:00).
The results and the points of the matches between the same teams that were already played during the preliminary round shall be taken into account for the classification round.

Pool E

|}

|}

Pool F

|}

|}

Pool G

|}

|}

Final round
All times are Indochina Time (UTC+7:00).

5th–8th places

5th–8th semifinals
|}

7th place match
|}

5th place match
|}

Final four

Semifinals
|}

3rd place match
|}

Final
|}

Final standing

Awards

Most Valuable Player

Best Setter

Best Outside Spikers

Best Middle Blockers

Best Opposite Spiker

Best Libero

See also
 2022 Asian Women's Volleyball Cup
 2022 Asian Men's Volleyball Challenge Cup

References

External links
 Asian Volleyball Confederation – official website
 Squads

2022
Asian Cup
2022 in Thai sport
Asian Cup, Men
Asian Men's Volleyball Cup
2022 in Asian sport
2022 in volleyball